The Mechichi Cabinet was the 31st government of the Tunisian Republic. It was formed by Hichem Mechichi on the appointment of President Kais Saied. The government was formed in 2020 and fell in 2021.

Cabinet members

References 

Cabinets of Tunisia
Cabinets established in 2020
Cabinets disestablished in 2021
2020 establishments in Tunisia
2021 disestablishments in Tunisia